The West Australian Forest Alliance is an organization made up of a number of Western Australian environmental activist groups—concerned with the destruction of old-growth forests in the South West region.
It is a successor to and includes membership of the earlier groups the Campaign to Save Native Forests, South West Forests Defence Foundation, Great Walk Networking, and other member groups of the Conservation Council of Western Australia.

Affiliated groups
As found on the WAFA website. Not all of the groups listed were still active .

 Augusta Margaret River Friends of the Forest
 Australian Conservation Foundation
 Balingup Friends of the Forest 
 Blackwood Environment Society 
 Bridgetown-Greenbushes Friends of the Forest · 
 Busselton Dunsborough Environment Centre 
 Busselton Peace and Environment Group 
 Collie Conservation Group 
 Conservation Council of WA
 Darlington Adopt-A-Block 
 Denmark Conservation Society 
 Denmark Environment Centre 
 D'Entrecasteaux Coalition 
 Doctors for the Preservation of Old Growth Forest 
 Earth 
 Friends of the Blackwood Valley 
 Friends of Giblett 
 Friends of Jane 
 Friends of Kingston 
 Friends of the Tuart Forest 
 Grassroots Activist Forest Alliance 
 Greater Beedelup National Park Society 
 Great Walk Networking 
 Leeuwin Conservation Group 
 Margaret River Environment Centre 
 South Coast Environment Group 
 South West Environment Centre
 South West Forests Defence Foundation Inc
 The Wilderness Society of WA
 Warren Environment Group

See also
Woodchipping

Newsletter
 The Real forest news. Perth, W.A. : Western Australian Forest Alliance, 1992-1995. Ed. 1 (Dec. 1992)-ed. 6 (Feb. 1995).
 Forest campaign bulletin. Perth, W.A. : Western Australian Forest Alliance, 1994-   
 Western Australian forest times. Perth, W.A. : Western Australian Forest Alliance, 1999  irregular

Notes

References
 Crawford, Patricia, and Crawford, Ian (2003)  Contested country : a history of the Northcliffe area, Western Australia.  Nedlands, W.A. : University of Western Australia Press.   "The Charles and Joy Stapes South West Region Publications Fund".
 Lines, William J. (2006) Patriots : defending Australia's natural heritage  St. Lucia, Qld. : University of Queensland Press, 2006.  
 Schultz, Beth (1997) Giblett Block. - W.A. Forest Alliance outlines the significance of this old growth forest and reasons for its preservation. Great walk news July 1997, p. 1-3,

External links
 http://www.wafa.org.au/

Nature conservation in Western Australia
Environmental organisations based in Australia
Forests of Western Australia